Joseph Gulston may refer to:

Joseph Gulston (chaplain) (1603–1669), chaplain and almoner to Charles I of England
Joseph Gulston (politician) (1674–1766), first cousin of the above, merchant and Member of Parliament for Poole
Joseph Gulston (collector) (1745–1786), son of the above, collector and connoisseur and MP for Poole